Lee Ho-Jin (born 9 March 1983) is a South Korean football defender. He has also played for Spanish club Racing de Santander, South Korean club Incheon United, Finnish club JJK, Thai Premier League club Insee-Police Utd and South Korean second-tier Korea National League side Goyang Kookmin Bank FC.

Career 
He joined Racing de Santander in February 2006, but he suffered from injuries. His La Liga debut was 24 May 2006, in the last game of the 2005–2006 season against Villarreal CF. After two years at the club, he transferred to Incheon United.

He has had a tryout with the Finnish club FC Haka who wanted Lee to play as a left back, but he was not signed. In March 2009 he joined Finnish club JJK on a tryout. He was loaned to FC Jyväskylä Blackbird in August 2009.

Club career statistics

References

External links
 
 FIFA Player Statistics

1983 births
Living people
Association football defenders
South Korean footballers
South Korean expatriate footballers
Racing de Santander players
Incheon United FC players
JJK Jyväskylä players
Lee Ho-jin
K League 1 players
La Liga players
Veikkausliiga players
Korea National League players
Expatriate footballers in Spain
Expatriate footballers in Finland
Expatriate footballers in Thailand
South Korean expatriate sportspeople in Spain
South Korean expatriate sportspeople in Finland
South Korean expatriate sportspeople in Thailand
Sungkyunkwan University alumni
Footballers from Seoul